Stephen Cameron  is an American financial analyst, economist and author. He is currently Adjunct Associate Professor and was for many years an Associate Professor of Economics at Columbia University, and is currently serving as Director at Citi.

He is most noted for his econometric and applied work on educational selection, the dynamics of educational attainment, and the causal value of General Educational Development test outcomes while a professor at Columbia and a dissertator under James Heckman at the University of Chicago.

He has held quantitative financial analyst and management roles at Wall Street firms, including Citadel LLC, Lord Abbett, and Continuum Investment Management. A graduate of the University of Chicago and Brigham Young University, he has co-authored an academic book studying poverty in New York City. He lives in New York City with his children and wife Marianne Cameron, a historian and Fulbright-Hays Recipient.

See also
 List of economists
 List of University of Chicago alumni
 List of Brigham Young University alumni
 List of Columbia University people

References

External links
 
 

Living people
American financial analysts
Econometricians
Microeconomists
Microeconometricians
University of Chicago alumni
Brigham Young University alumni
Columbia University faculty
20th-century American economists
American male non-fiction writers
21st-century American economists
Year of birth missing (living people)